Rutland Charter Township is a charter township of Barry County in the U.S. state of Michigan. The population was 3,987 at the 2010 census.

Geography

Communities
Glass Creek was the name of a post office here from 1849 until 1864.

Demographics
As of the census of 2000, there were 3,646 people, 1,341 households, and 1,059 families residing in the township. The racial makeup of the township was 97.59% White, 0.22% African American, 0.44% Native American, 0.36% Asian, 0.44% from other races, and 0.96% from two or more races. Hispanic or Latino of any race were 1.59% of the population.

There were 1,341 households, out of which 35.6% had children under the age of 18 living with them, 67.3% were married couples living together, 6.3% had a female householder with no husband present, and 21.0% were non-families. 17.0% of all households were made up of individuals, and 6.3% had someone living alone who was 65 years of age or older.  The average household size was 2.72 and the average family size was 3.03.

In the township the population was spread out, with 27.1% under the age of 18, 7.0% from 18 to 24, 28.8% from 25 to 44, 25.6% from 45 to 64, and 11.6% who were 65 years of age or older.  The median age was 37 years. For every 100 females, there were 103.0 males.  For every 100 females age 18 and over, there were 103.0 males.

The median income for a household in the township was $52,065, and the median income for a family was $59,291. Males had a median income of $40,132 versus $27,059 for females. The per capita income for the township was $23,141.  About 3.3% of families and 3.9% of the population were below the poverty line, including 3.1% of those under age 18 and 13.0% of those age 65 or over.

References

Notes

Sources

External links
Rutland Charter Township official website

Townships in Barry County, Michigan
Charter townships in Michigan
Grand Rapids metropolitan area